John Hugh Liedtke (February 10, 1922 – March 28, 2003) was an American petroleum executive.

Early life
John Hugh Liedtke was born on February 10, 1922, in Tulsa, Oklahoma. During World War II, he served in the United States Armed Forces. Liedtke graduated from Amherst College in three years with a bachelor's degree, Harvard Business School with an MBA, and University of Texas School of Law.

Career
Liedtke moved to Midland, Texas, then opened a law practice with his brother, William, in 1949.

With the future President of the United States George H. W. Bush, the two brothers co-founded the Zapata Corporation in 1953. In the 1960s the Liedtke brothers acquired control of the South Penn Oil Company and merged it with Zapata to form a new company they called Pennzoil. In the 1980s, during his time as CEO of Pennzoil, he led the company to a court victory over Texaco.

Death
Liedtke died on March 28, 2003, in Houston, Texas.

References

External links

1922 births
2003 deaths
American businesspeople in the oil industry
Amherst College alumni
Harvard Business School alumni
Businesspeople from Tulsa, Oklahoma
University of Texas School of Law alumni
United States Navy officers
20th-century American businesspeople
American military personnel of World War II